William Christopher Brown OBE (16 September 1928 – 16 March 2005) was a structural engineer and bridge designer who specialised in suspension bridges. He is credited with the idea of designing bridge decks with an aerofoil-shaped cross section (in effect an upside-down wing) for stability in a wide variety of wind conditions.

He was educated at Monmouth School, University College, Southampton and Imperial College London.

He was one of the principal designers at Freeman Fox & Partners (now Hyder Consulting) from 1956 to 1985.
In 1987 he set up the Brown Beech & Associates.

List of bridges 
 1957. Adomi Bridge on the Volta River, Ghana, length 334m/1095 ft, arch span 245m/803 ft with a suspended roadway (Consulting Engineer: Freeman Fox & Partners)
 1959-1971. Auckland Harbour Bridge, New Zealand, length 1020m/3346 ft, main span 243m/797 ft (designed by Sir Gilbert Roberts and William Brown)
 1964. Forth Road Bridge, Scotland, length 1824m, main span 1006m/3300 ft (designed by Mot, Hay, Anderson, Sir Gilbert Roberts and William Brown at Freeman Fox & Partners)
 1966. Wye Bridge, link South Wales-England, length 1153m/3184 ft, main span 235m/1000 ft (Consulting Engineer: Freeman Fox)
 1966. Severn Bridge, England, length 1839m/6033 ft, main span 988m/3240 ft (designed by Mott, Hay, Anderson, Sir Gilbert Roberts and William Brown at the Freeman Fox & Partners)
 1971. Erskine Bridge, Scotland, length 524m/1719, main span 305m/1000 ft (designed by William Brown)
 1973. Bosporus Bridge, Turkey, length 1560m/5118 ft, main span 1074m/3523 ft (William Brown was the partner responsible for design at Freeman Fox)
 1975. Cleddau Bridge, Wales, length 820m (designed at Freeman Fox & Partners)
 1978. West Gate Bridge, Australia, length 2583m, main span 336m (designed by William Brown at Freeman Fox & Partners)
 1981. Humber Bridge, England, length 2220m/7283 ft, main span 1410m/4264 ft (designed at the Freeman Fox & Partners)
 1988. Bosporus II Bridge, Turkey, length 1090m/3576 ft, main span 1090m/3576 ft (William Brown was the bridge designer and engineer for construction)
 1993.  Vidyasagar Setu (Hooghly II Bridge), India, length 823m/2700 ft, main span 457.5m/1500 ft (Consulting Engineer: Freeman Fox & Partners)
 1998. Storebaelt Bridge, Denmark, length 6800m/4.2 miles, main span 1624m/5328 ft (Major development in cable spinning using William Brown's controlled tension method)
 2001. Triangle Link, Norway, length max 1077m/3533 ft, main span 677m/2221 ft (Brown Beech carried out erection engineering for the superstructure which included further development in cable spinning)

Bridges proposed or not yet built 
 1993. (yet to be built) Strait of Messina Bridge, Italy, length 3666m/12028 ft, main span 3300m/10827 ft (William Brown and "Brown Beech & Associates" were engaged by Stretto di Messina SPA to lead the innovative bridge design)
 1995. proposed Dardanelles Bridge, Turkey, length 2150m/7053 ft, main span 1450m/4757 ft (based on the designs, specifications and calculations of William Brown and W.W.Frishmann)
 1997. proposed Java-Bali Bridge, Indonesia, length, main span 2100m/6889 ft (designed by William Brown at Brown Beech)
 1997. proposed Izmit Bay Bridge, Turkey, length 3.3 km/2 miles, main span 1688m/5538 ft (designed by William Brown at Brown Beech)
 2003. (yet to be built) Tsing Lung Bridge, length, main span 1418m/4652 ft (Consulting Engineers: Brown Beech Associates)

References

External links 
 
 Times Obituary
 Freeman Fox & Partners information at Structurae
 Brown Beech Associates information at Structurae
 Brown Beech Associates
 List of the "Bridge Awards" by the International Bridge Conference

1928 births
2005 deaths
People educated at Monmouth School for Boys
Alumni of Imperial College London
British bridge engineers
Structural engineers
Officers of the Order of the British Empire
Strait of Messina Bridge